The Fairchild XC-120 Packplane was an American experimental modular aircraft first flown in 1950. It was developed from the company's C-119 Flying Boxcar, and was unique in the unconventional use of removable cargo pods that were attached below the fuselage, instead of possessing an internal cargo compartment.

Design and development
The XC-120 Packplane began as a C-119B fuselage (48-330, c/n 10312) with a point just below the flight deck cut off to create the space for the detachable cargo pod. The fuselage was raised by several feet, and smaller diameter "twinned" wheels were installed forward of each of the main landing gear struts to serve as nosewheels, while the main struts were extended backwards.

All four landing gear units, in matching "nose" and "main" sets, could be raised and lowered in a scissorlike fashion to lower the aircraft and facilitate the removal of a planned variety of wheeled pods which would be attached below the fuselage for the transport of cargo. The goal was to allow cargo to be preloaded into the pods; it was claimed that such an arrangement would speed up loading and unloading cargo.

Production aircraft were to be designated C-128.

Operational history
Only one XC-120 was built. Though the aircraft was tested extensively and made numerous airshow appearances in the early 1950s the project went no further. It was tested by the Air Proving Ground Command at Eglin Air Force Base, Florida, in 1951, before the project was abandoned in 1952. The prototype was eventually scrapped.

Specifications (XC-120)

See also

References

Evans, Stanley H. "Cargo Carrier Concept:Design-logic for Airborne Logistics: The Fairchild XC-120 Pack-plane". Flight, 21 September 1950. pp. 331–333.

External links

Video about the XC-120
 Contains segment about the plane.

Fairchild C-120 Packplane
C-120
Twin-boom aircraft
Modular aircraft
Aircraft first flown in 1950
Mid-wing aircraft
Twin piston-engined tractor aircraft